The women's +78 kg competition at the 2021 European Judo Championships was held on 18 April at the Altice Arena.

Results

Final

Repechage

Top half

Bottom half

References

External links
 

W79
European Judo Championships Women's Heavyweight
European W79